Cham-e Pir (also Romanized as Cham-e Pīr and Cham Pīr) is a village in Cham Rud Rural District, Bagh-e Bahadoran District, Lenjan County, Isfahan Province, Iran. At the 2006 census, its population was 236, in 64 families.

References 

Populated places in Lenjan County